Hacavitz is a Mexican extreme metal band formed in 2003 by Antimo Buonnano and Oscar García. The band took their name from the Mayan god Jacawitz. The lyrical themes include death, darkness, and pre-Hispanic mythology. Since its formation, the band has released five studio albums, one EP, and four split albums.

History
Hacavitz was founded by Antimo Buonnano and Oscar García in 2003.

The band's first two studio albums titled "Vengeance" and "Katun" were released through the label Moribund Records. Their third album "Metztli Obscura" was released through the Mexican label Embrace My Funeral Records. In 2015, Hacavitz release their fourth album "Darkness Beyond" in which the band switched to black metal and was released by the label Dark Descent Records and Concreto Records in the United States and Mexico respectively. In 2017 they released their fifth album "Nex Nihil"; it maintains its dark and dense essence of black metal that it has been displaying in the band's two previous albums. In 2020, they released 2 splits, "Ad Noctem" with Espectrum Mortis (Spain) on VOMIT Records and "Tercer Nadir Venenoso" with Valdraveth and Theurgia on MAT Records.

Members

Current members
Antimo Buonnano - guitars, bass, vocals (2003–present)
César "Led" Sánchez - drums (2011–present)
Iván Ochoa - guitar (2014–present)

Live members
Edgar García - bass (2013-2014)
Fernando León Cortés - bass (2018-present)

Former members
Alberto Allende - drums (2010–2011)
Diego - bass (2013)
Óscar García - drums (2003–2010)
Eduardo Guevara - guitars (2003-2006)
Antonio Nolasco - bass (2003-2013)
Ulises Sánchez - bass (2014-2016)

Discography
Studio albums
Venganza (2005)
Katun (2007)
Metztli Obscura (2010)
Darkness Beyond (2015)
Nex Nihil (2018)

EP
Hacavitz (2004)

Singles
"Lusting the Dead of the Night" (2005)

Split
Apocalyptik Blasphemy of the Revolutionists (split with Zygoatsis) (2006)
Rituals of the Night (split with Thornspawn) (2008)
Ad Noctem (split with Espectrum Mortis) (2020)
Tercer nadir venenoso (split with Valdraveth and Theurgia) (2020)

References

External links
Official Bandsite

Mexican death metal musical groups
Blackened death metal musical groups
Black metal musical groups
Musical groups established in 2003
2003 establishments in Mexico